Érica Gomes (born 9 May 1994) is a Portuguese Paralympic athlete who competes in high jump, long jump and triple jump at international level events.

References

1994 births
Living people
Sportspeople from Coimbra
Athletes from Lisbon
Paralympic athletes of Portugal
Portuguese high jumpers
Portuguese female long jumpers
Portuguese female triple jumpers
Athletes (track and field) at the 2016 Summer Paralympics
Medalists at the World Para Athletics Championships
Medalists at the World Para Athletics European Championships
Athletes (track and field) at the 2020 Summer Paralympics